Lyell Island, known also in the Haida language as Athlii Gwaii, is a large island in the Haida Gwaii archipelago on the North Coast of British Columbia, Canada. The island is a part of the Gwaii Haanas National Park Reserve and Haida Heritage Site.

Lyell Island was the focus of anti-logging demonstrations that led to establishment of Gwaii Haanas park in 1993. 72 Haida citizens were arrested by the RCMP and charged with Contempt of Court. Also arrested on Lyell Island was a Canadian MP, Svend Robinson. The protests started October 24, 1985, and continued for three months and eventually led to the process which culminated in the creation of Gwaii Haanas.

See also 
 List of islands of British Columbia

References

External links 

Lyell Island: 25 Years Later, Larry Pynn, Vancouver Sun, Nov. 13, 2010 (archived at wildernesscommittee.org)
An undergraduate research project: The Story of Lyell Island, Brittany Yu, Julia Wakeling, Malik Sayadi and Jaimie Wu, April 12, 2017
Loggers Confront Haida Blockade, CBC Digital Archives, Nov. 2, 1985

Islands of Haida Gwaii
Haida